Bram Dijkstra (born 5 July 1938) is an American author, literary critic and former professor of English literature. Dijkstra wrote seven books on various literary and artistic subjects concerning writing. He also curates art exhibitions and writes catalog essays for San Diego art museums.

He joined the faculty of the University of California, San Diego in 1966 and taught there until he retired and became an emeritus professor in 2000.

Publications 
 Faces in Skin: Poems and Drawings (Oyez, 1965)
 Hieroglyphics of a New Speech: Cubism, Stieglitz and the Early Poetry of William Carlos Williams (Princeton University Press, 1970) 
Idols of Perversity: Fantasies of Feminine Evil in Fin-de-siècle Culture  (Oxford University Press, 1986)
Evil Sisters: The Threat of Female Sexuality and the Cult of Manhood (Knopf, 1996)
 Georgia O'Keeffe and the Eros of Place (Princeton University Press, 1998)
 American Expressionism: Art and Social Change 1920–1950 (Harry N. Abrams, 2003)
 Naked: The Nude in America (Rizzoli, 2010)

Reception 
Hieroglyphics of a New Speech
"Dijkstra catches the excitement of this period [1920s] of revolutionary art, reveals the interactions between writers and painters, and shows in particular the specific and general impact this world had on Williams's early writings." – Literary Studies: Art 
"In this good book, with competence in matters of both painting and poetry Dijkstra most usefully clarifies an area of literary history that has hitherto been somewhat uncertainly documented." – American Literary Scholarship, 1970.

Evil Sisters
"An ideological study tracing the roots of distorted ideas of gender, sex and race." – San Diego Magazine, Dec. 1996.
"[Dijkstra] has a way of refocusing the lens of cultural analysis on images and texts, so that the once taken for granted is seen wholly anew. Virtually every page is sprinkled with nuggets of insight, evidence of scholarly command of the material and expository skill." – San Francisco Chronicle, Oct. 20, 1996.
"Dijkstra provides another scholarly work that reveals the historical basis for gender and race imagery and conflict in modern culture, especially in film and television…This compelling, thought-provoking work is recommended especially for academic libraries and gender studies collections." – Library Journal, Oct. 1, 1996.
"Dijkstra writes so compellingly that in his hands what might be portentous is a page-turning good read." – Booklist, Oct. 1, 1996.
"Dijkstra, who writes about sex with irrepressible verve, could be Camille Paglia's twin brother, kidnapped in childhood by moralists and raised in the cult of race-gender-and-class guilt."  – Kirkus Reviews, Oct. 1, 1996

Georgia O'Keeffe and the Eros of Place

"Georgia O'Keeffe and the Eros of Place… rewards the persistent reader by shedding new light on a remarkable career." – Michael Berry, The Moving Finger, Feb. 20, 1999.
"[Dijkstra]…writes lyrically of how the sense of landscape set the stage for O'Keeffe's life." – The Sunday Oregonian, Jan. 10, 1999.

American Expressionism
"…Rescue(s) a generation of art too long forgotten." – New Labor Forum, Summer 2004.
"American Expressionism brings back into the light a revolutionary generation of artists whom cynicism had conspired, for half a century and more, to airbrush out." – San Francisco Chronicle, Aug. 10, 2003.
"This story is important to all who care about American art and society." – Los Angeles Times. Book Review. July 6, 2003.
"Landmark study...carefully conceived...compellingly recasts and revitalizes the social realist period of American art...a valuable addition." – Library Journal, June 1, 2003.

Naked: The Nude In America

"...gorgeously illustrated book called Naked which explores the traditional, the beautiful, and the shocking in the portrayal of the nude in America... a tremendously beautiful coffee table book."  – Carone, Angela, and Maureen Cavanaugh, "Looking at Nudity in American Art," KPBS, Oct. 26, 2010.
"…It's all in there, gorgeous, raw and illuminating. Some works shock, and others are comfortingly conventional, but they all reward the viewer's patient scrutiny." – The San Diego Union Tribune, Nov. 7, 2010.
"In "Naked," Dijkstra … deftly assembles a richly illustrated history of the American nude that spans centuries and media." – Artinfo.com, Oct. 27, 2010.

Note 
He is probably best known for two books that have escaped the academic world into the world of popular culture: Idols of Perversity and Evil Sisters.

These two books discuss vamp imagery, femmes fatales, and similar threatening images of female sexuality in a number of works of literature and art. In comedian Steve Martin's short novel Shopgirl, Martin's heroine claims that Idols of Perversity is her favorite book.

References

External links
 Interview with Bram Dijkstra

1938 births
Living people
American literary critics
American people of Dutch descent
University of California, San Diego faculty
American academics of English literature